Josef Chochol (13 December 1880, Písek – 6 July 1956, Prague) was a Czech architect.

Education

Chochol studied architecture at the polytechnic in Prague (1908–24), then at the academy in Vienna, under the guidance of Otto Wagner (1907–09).

Career

He was one of three significant Cubist architects, together with Pavel Janák and Josef Gočár; all three were members of the Mánes Union of Fine Arts. Chochol was a member since 1913 until he was expelled in 1945 for "patriotic deficiency".

Three buildings he designed in Vyšehrad (part of Prague) are considered masterworks of cubist architecture:
 Villa Kovařovic (Kovařovicova vila) at Libušina 49 near Rašínově nábřeží / square, named after the owner Bedřich Kovařovic, constructed 1912-13
 a cubist villa at Neklanova 98, based on a design by František Hodek, constructed 1912-13
 a villa, now called Kubistický Trojdům (the "Cubist Threehouse"), at Rašínovo nábřeží 47, constructed 1913-14

Other of his projects were:
 renovation of the Brožík-hall in the Old City Hall
 the original Troja-bridge (Trojský most) between Holešovice and Troja, designed with engineer František Mencl, constructed 1926-28; renamed Barricades bridge (Barikádníků most) in 1946 and in service until 1975

Most of his other designs (cubist factory, theater) were admired but never realized. In 1914 he abandoned the Cubist style and began working in the internationally oriented constructivist style. 

Chochol was also active in politics: he was a founding member of the Left Front organisation and the Association of Socialist Architects, and was the only one of the Czech Cubists with strong political views.

See also
Czech Cubism

External links

Short biography, photos of his designs
Biography (in Czech)

Czech architects
1880 births
1956 deaths
Cubist architects
Czech Technical University in Prague alumni